Diffing may refer to:
A type of drifting (motorsport) or doughnut (driving)
diffing, use of the  utility in computing